Lee I-yang (born 16 December 1947) is a Taiwanese politician of the Democratic Progressive Party (DPP). He was the Secretary-General of the DPP.

References

Living people
1947 births
National Taiwan Ocean University alumni
Democratic Progressive Party (Taiwan) politicians
Taiwanese Ministers of the Interior
Taipei City Councilors
21st-century Taiwanese politicians
20th-century Taiwanese politicians